Dame Uta Frith  (née Aurnhammer; born 25 May 1941) is a German-British developmental psychologist at the Institute of Cognitive Neuroscience at University College London. She has pioneered much of the current research into autism and dyslexia. She has written several books on these subjects, arguing for autism to be seen as a mental condition rather than as one caused by parenting. Her Autism: Explaining the Enigma introduces the cognitive neuroscience of autism. She is credited with creating the Sally–Anne test along with fellow scientists Alan Leslie and Simon Baron-Cohen. She also pioneered the work on child dyslexia. Among students she has mentored are Tony Attwood, Maggie Snowling, Simon Baron-Cohen and Francesca Happé.

Education
Frith was born Uta Aurnhammer in Rockenhausen, a small village in the hills between Luxembourg and Mannheim in Germany. She attended the Saarland University in Saarbrücken with her initial plan for her education in art history, but changed to experimental psychology after learning of its empirical nature. She was inspired by the work of many psychologists and psychoanalysts, such as Hans Eysenck, and decided to train in clinical psychology at the Institute of Psychiatry in London. While at the Institute she worked closely with Jack Rachman. She went on to complete her Doctor of Philosophy, on pattern detection in neurotypical and autistic children, in 1968.

She was mentored, during her early career, by Neil O'Connor and Beate Hermelin and has described them as pioneers in the field of autism.

Research
Frith's research paved the way for a theory of mind deficit in autism. While she was a member of the Cognitive Development Unit (CDU) in London, in 1985 she published with Alan M. Leslie and Simon Baron-Cohen the article "Does the autistic child have a 'theory of mind'?", which proposed that people with autism have specific difficulties understanding other people's beliefs and desires. Frith, along with Alan Leslie and Simon Baron-Cohen, created two theories of autism. The first is "lack of implicit mentalization" – lack of the ability to know ones own mental state. The second is "weak central coherence", by which she suggested that individuals with autism are better than typical at processing details, but worse at integrating information from many different sources. Frith was one of the first neuro-scientists to recognize "autism as a condition of the brain rather than the result of cold parenting." In 1985, Frith, Leslie, and Baron-Cohen created the Sally-Anne test to measure a child's cognitive understanding. A child with autism would generally get the Sally-Anne questions incorrect, while a typical child or a child with Down Syndrome would generally get the questions correct. In 1996, Frith, Eraldo Paulesu, and Maggie Snowling conducted a longitudinal research study showing that, while completing tasks requiring phonological processing, people with autism show a lack of connectivity between the front and back of their brain.

She was one of the first in the UK to study Asperger's syndrome, at CDU London. Her work focused on reading development, spelling and dyslexia. Frith attacked the theory that dyslexia was linked to lack of intelligence or caused by impairment in visual recognition. In 1980, she published a book on dyslexia, recounting how patients with dyslexia can be perfectly apt readers, but have persistent spelling errors, whereas it had commonly been thought was that the two entities were not mutually exclusive. Her research, along with Maggie Snowling's, showed that dyslexics tend to struggle with phonological processing.

Frith has been supported through her career by the Medical Research Council at University College London. Frith is an active collaborator at the Interacting Minds Centre at Aarhus University in Denmark. The goal of the centre is to provide a trans-disciplinary platform, upon which the many aspects of human interaction may be studied. The project is based in part on a paper written with Chris Frith: "Interacting Minds – a Biological Basis".

Supporting women in science
Frith has advocated the advancement of women in science, in part by developing a support network called Science & Shopping, which she hopes will "encourage women to share ideas and information that are inspiring and fun." She also co-founded the UCL Women network, "a grassroots networking and social organization for academic staff (postdocs and above) in STEM at UCL," in January 2013. In 2015 she was named chair of the Royal Society's Diversity Committee, where she has written about unconscious bias and how it affects which scientists receive grants.

In the media
On 11 May 2012, Frith appeared as a guest on the American PBS Charlie Rose television interview show. On 4 December she appeared as a guest on the "Brain" episode of BBC Two's Dara Ó Briain's Science Club.

On 1 March 2013, she was the guest on BBC Radio 4's Desert Island Discs.

Frith has written on the visibility of women in science, by promoting an exhibition on female scientist portraits at The Royal Society in 2013.

From 31 March to 4 April 2014, to coincide with World Autism Awareness Day on 2 April, she was the guest of Sarah Walker on BBC Radio 3's Essential Classics. On 1 April 2014, she featured in "Living with Autism", an episode of the BBC's Horizon documentary series.

On 26 August 2015, she presented the Horizon episode entitled "OCD: A Monster in my Mind", and on 29 August 2017, she presented the Horizon episode entitled "What Makes a Psychopath?".

On 13 December 2017, she gave an interview to the Association for Child and Adolescent Mental Health, in which she talked about her early life and her passion for autism research in children.

Awards
Frith was elected a Fellow of the British Academy and a Fellow of the Academy of Medical Sciences in 2001, a Fellow of the Royal Society in 2005, an Honorary Fellow of the British Psychological Society in 2006, a member of the German Academy of Sciences Leopoldina in 2008, an Honorary Fellow of Newnham College, Cambridge in 2008, a Foreign Associate of the National Academy of Sciences in 2012, an Honorary Dame Commander of the Order of the British Empire in 2012, and a Williams James Fellow Award in 2013. 

She was President of the Experimental Psychology Society in 2006–2007. In 2009 Frith and her husband jointly received the European Latsis Prize for their contribution to understanding the human mind and brain. 

Frith was awarded the Mind & Brain Prize in 2010. In 2014, she and her husband won the Jean Nicod Prize, for their work on social cognition. In 2015, she was listed as one of BBC's 100 Women.

Frith's honorary damehood (DBE) was made substantive on 4 April 2019. This allowed her to be called Dame Uta.

Personal life
Frith married Chris Frith in 1966. He is now Professor Emeritus at the Wellcome Trust Centre for Neuroimaging at University College London. In 2008 a double portrait was painted by Emma Wesley. They have two sons.

In 2009 Frith and her husband jointly received the European Latsis Prize for their contribution to understanding the human mind and brain. 

She holds the title of Professor Emeritus of Cognitive Development at University College London.

References

External links

Profile, ICN Developmental Group
Profile, UCL IRIS (Institutional Research Information Service)
Interview with Uta Frith
"Exploring Autism – A conversation with Uta Frith", Ideas Roadshow (29 March 2013)
A historical look at the transition from "mentally defective" etc. to autism, August 2014, by Uta Frith

Living people
1941 births
Academics of University College London
Alumni of King's College London
Autism researchers
Developmental psychologists
Dyslexia researchers
Fellows of the Academy of Medical Sciences (United Kingdom)
Fellows of the British Academy
Fellows of the Royal Society
Female Fellows of the Royal Society
Foreign associates of the National Academy of Sciences
German emigrants to the United Kingdom
German expatriates in England
German women psychologists
Dames Commander of the Order of the British Empire
Honorary Fellows of Newnham College, Cambridge
BBC 100 Women